Lobophytum proprium is a species of soft coral in the family Alcyoniidae and the genus Lobophytum. It is found on Vanuatu.

References 

Alcyoniidae
Animals described in 1970